Berovci is a village in Municipality of Prilep, North Macedonia.

Demographics
As of the 2021 census, Berovci had 365 residents with the following ethnic composition:
Macedonians 340
Persons for whom data are taken from administrative sources 23
Others 2

According to the 2002 census, the village had a total of 334 inhabitants. Ethnic groups in the village include:
Macedonians 333
Others 1

References

Villages in Prilep Municipality